The T. B. Downing House is a historic house located at 706 Cowper St. in Palo Alto, California. The Queen Anne style house was built in 1894 for T. B. Downing, who served on Palo Alto's first city council. A conical tower tops the house's northern corner; the tower features a finial, a dentillated and bracketed cornice, and decorative shinglework. The porch features a decorated gable and gingerbread-style ornamentation along the roof, columns, and balustrade. Two other gables, one at the second floor and one at the attic, adorn the front of the house; both gables feature decorative bargeboards.

The house was added to the National Register of Historic Places on October 30, 1973.

References

Houses on the National Register of Historic Places in California
Queen Anne architecture in California
Houses completed in 1894
Houses in Palo Alto, California
National Register of Historic Places in Santa Clara County, California